Hossam Abdul Monem ( born 12 February 1975 in Egypt) is a retired Egyptian footballer. He has played for the Egypt national football team and participated in the 2000 African Cup of Nations. Previously, he played for Zamalek, Kocaelispor (Turkey), El-Ittihad and Masry. In Egypt, he started his career in Division II club.

12 Titles For Zamalek
3 Egyptian League title for Zamalek 2000/2001, 2002/2003 & 2003/2004 
1 Egyptian Super Cup for Zamalek (2001/2002) 
2 Egyptian Super Cup for Zamalek (2000/2001 & 2001/2002) 
1 Egyptian Cup title for Zamalek 1998/99 
1 African Cup Winners' Cup for Zamalek 2000 
1 African Champions' League for Zamalek 2002
1 African Super Cup for Zamalek 2002 
1 Arab Club Championship for Zamalek 2003 
1 Egyptian Saudi Super Cup for Zamalek 2003

External links
 
 

1975 births
Living people
Egyptian footballers
Egyptian expatriate footballers
Egypt international footballers
1999 FIFA Confederations Cup players
Kocaelispor footballers
Expatriate footballers in Turkey
Eastern Company SC players
Zamalek SC players
Al Masry SC players
Al Ittihad Alexandria Club players
Süper Lig players
Egyptian expatriate sportspeople in Turkey
2000 African Cup of Nations players
Egyptian Premier League players
Association football defenders